Bernard Flexner (1865–1945), a New York lawyer, was a prominent member of the Zionist Organization of America.

Flexner was born in Louisville, Kentucky to a family that immigrated from Europe in the early 1860s. He studied law in the University of Louisville and the University of Virginia. He was admitted to the Kentucky bar in 1898. He practiced law until 1914, when he became active in public activity. He was chair of a Juvenile court board in Louisville and in 1917 participated in a Red cross delegation to Romania. He served as counsel for the Zionist delegation to the Paris Peace Conference (1918–1919) and in 1925 he was one of the founders of the Palestine Economic Corporation (PEC). He served as president of PEC until 1931 and afterwards was chairman of the director council of the PEC.

He was one of the founders of the Council on Foreign Relations.

His papers are held in the Seeley G. Mudd Manuscript Library at Princeton University.

Writings
The Rights to a Jewish Home Land, The Nation, October 2, 1929.

External links
Bernard Flexner Papers at the Seeley G. Mudd Manuscript Library, Princeton University

References

1865 births
1945 deaths
American Jews
American lawyers
People from New York (state)
American Zionists